Mărculești may refer to these places in Romania:

Mărculești, a commune in Ialomița County
 Mărculești-Gară, a village in Perișoru Commune, Călărași County

Mărculești may also refer to these places in Moldova:
Mărculești, a city in Florești District
Mărculești, a commune also in Florești District

Mărculești may also refer to:
Mărculești Air Force Base, a military base in Mărculești city

See also 
 Marcu (name)
 Mărcești (disambiguation)